Djiguiya de Koloni is a rural commune in the Cercle of Yanfolila in the Sikasso Region of southern Mali. The commune covers an area of 559 square kilometers and includes 9 villages. In the 2009 census it had a population of 6,857. The village of Koloni, the administrative center (chef-lieu) of the commune, is 46 km southeast of Yanfolila.

References

External links
.

Communes of Sikasso Region